Lodgepole Creek is a tributary of the South Platte River, approximately  long, in the U.S. states of Wyoming, Nebraska and Colorado.  Lodgepole Creek drains a basin in the interior of a low plateau which lies between the South Platte Basin and the North Platte Basin in the southeastern corner of Wyoming, the southern edge of the Nebraska Panhandle and several small portions of northeastern Colorado.  As its name implies, Lodgepole Creek is a very small stream; for nearly all of its length it flows through the semiarid High Plains. The Lodgepole Creek Valley has been a major transportation route for over 100 years; the line of the original transcontinental railroad, the Lincoln Highway/U.S. Highway 30 and Interstate 80 all run along the stream for much of its length.

Description
The creek flows east, north of Cheyenne; it enters Nebraska just east of Pine Bluffs, Wyoming. In Nebraska, it flows to the east past Kimball, Sidney and Chappell; at Chappell, Lodgepole Creek turns to the southeast and flows into Colorado.

Early irrigation

According to a 1921 history of the Nebraska Panhandle, the first irrigation in that part of the state took place in the Lodgepole valley in 1871.  A dam was built across the creek at Fort Sidney and used to provide water for crops raised by the post's soldiers.  As more settlers moved into the valley, dams and ditches proliferated throughout the valley; according to the 1921 history, downstream flow was maintained by the narrowness of the valley and the fact that the creek was fed by springs along its entire length.

See also
List of rivers of Colorado
List of rivers of Nebraska
List of rivers of Wyoming

References

External links
USGS Lodgepole Creek flow data (Bushnell, Nebraska)
1864 description of Lodgepole Creek
Flow data at Ovid, Colorado Colorado Division of Natural Resources

Rivers of Colorado
Rivers of Nebraska
Rivers of Wyoming
Rivers of Deuel County, Nebraska
Rivers of Cheyenne County, Nebraska
Rivers of Kimball County, Nebraska
Tributaries of the Platte River